Dundas Island may refer to:

 Dundas Island (British Columbia), Canada, located near the city of Prince Rupert.
 Dundas Island (Nunavut), Canada
 Dundas Island, New Zealand, one of the Auckland Islands